Mersalyl (Mersal) is an organomercury compound and mercurial diuretic. It is only rarely used as a drug, having been superseded by diuretic medications that do not contain mercury and are therefore less toxic. It features a Hg(II) centre. Mersalyl was originally adapted from calomel (Hg2Cl2), a diuretic discovered by Paracelsus.

See also

References

Acetic acids
Benzamides
Mercurial diuretics
Phenol ethers